Turbo tuberculosus is a species of medium-sized sea snail, a marine gastropod mollusk in the family Turbinidae the turban snails.

Some authors place this species in the subgenus Turbo (Marmarostoma).

Description
The length of the shell varies between 17 mm and 40 mm.
The imperforate, ventricose shell has an subovate-turreted shape with an acute spire that is transversely sulcate. The five whorls are convex and are longitudinally slightly striated. The color pattern is white or yellow, radialately flammulated with red or brown. The apex has a green shine. The inside of the round aperture is brightly white. A few whorls are tuberculate or covered with rather rough prickles.  The tubercles form three or four rows on the body whorl.

Distribution
This marine species occurs off Australia (the Northern Territory & Western Australia); off New Caledonia, the Philippines, the Solomon Island and Tonga.

References

 Alf A. & Kreipl K. (2003). A Conchological Iconography: The Family Turbinidae, Subfamily Turbininae, Genus Turbo. Conchbooks, Hackenheim Germany.
 Williams, S.T. (2007). Origins and diversification of Indo-West Pacific marine fauna: evolutionary history and biogeography of turban shells (Gastropoda, Turbinidae). Biological Journal of the Linnean Society, 2007, 92, 573–592.

External links
 

tuberculosus
Gastropods described in 1834